Mansuran is a village located in West Ludhiana in Ludhiana district, Punjab.

Administration
The village is administrated by a Sarpanch who is an elected representative of village as per the Constitution of India and the Panchayati Raj (India).

Mansuran Village is 14 kilometers from Ludhiana bus stand and railway station. Mansuran Village also has banking services by Oriental Bank (now  PNB), HDFC Bank, and the  SBI.

Villages in Ludhiana West Tehsil

Air travel connectivity 
The closest airport to the village is Sahnewal Airport.

References

Villages in Ludhiana West tehsil